Zuzana Nováčková (born 16 October 1945) is a Czech painter and printmaker.

She has been active as a painter as well since the 1990s. Her work is represented in the collection of the National Gallery of Art.

References

1945 births
Living people
Czech women painters
Czech printmakers
Women printmakers
20th-century Czech painters
20th-century printmakers
20th-century Czech women artists
21st-century Czech painters
21st-century printmakers
21st-century Czech women artists
Artists from Prague
Academy of Fine Arts, Prague alumni